José León Sandoval de la Cerda (1789 – 1854) was a Nicaraguan politician, member of the short lived centrist Republican Party, who served as 4th Supreme Director of Nicaragua from 4 April 1845 to 12 March 1847.

A mestizo descendant of the conquistador Gonzalo de Sandoval, Sandoval was a justice of the peace at the close of the colonial period in his native Granada, but he also worked in transporting goods on Lake Nicaragua and the Río San Juan.

Resentful of the privileges of Spanish officials and wealthier creoles, Sandoval supported independence from Spain and then opposed Nicaraguan incorporation into Iturbide's Mexican Empire. In 1825 he became political chief of Granada and later served in other government positions while rising in military rank.

A fervent unionist, he also served Francisco Morazán's federal government in San Salvador. He was supreme director of Nicaragua during the violent struggles among the caudillos Francisco Malespín, José Trinidad Muñoz, and 
. Although a liberal, Sandoval remained loyal to the elected governments, and under the conservative Fruto Chamorro, he directed Granada's defense against the siege begun in May 1854 by Máximo Jérez, during the beginning stages of the Filibuster War. Brigadier General Sandoval died in this defense and was buried in Granada.

See also 
 Laureano Pineda
 Filibuster War
 Francisco Castellón

Bibliography
 

Presidents of Nicaragua